James Franklin Barnett (born July 7, 1944) is a former professional basketball player. He was the Golden State Warriors television analyst from 1985 to 2019, and is currently splits time with Tom Tolbert as the team's radio color analyst on 95.7 The Game.

Basketball career

Youth and college career

Barnett was born in Greenville, South Carolina and raised in Riverside, California.  He is a member of the Riverside Hall of Fame, and was selected as an NCAA All-American as a University of Oregon basketball player.

He is in the University of Oregon Hall of Fame and the State of Oregon Hall of Fame. He was inducted into the Pac-12 Basketball Hall of Honor during the 2012 Pac-12 Conference men's basketball tournament on March 10, 2012.

Pro career

Barnett's NBA career began when the Boston Celtics selected him with the eighth pick overall in the 1966 NBA draft.   He later played for the Warriors for three seasons (1971–74) and five other teams during his 11-year career, including the San Diego Rockets, the Portland Trail Blazers, the New Orleans Jazz, New York Knicks, and the Philadelphia 76ers.

While playing for the Trail Blazers in 1971, Barnett attempted a rushed long-range shot against the rival Los Angeles Lakers. His shot went in, prompting Blazers play-by-play announcer Bill Schonely to exclaim "Rip City! All right!" The phrase "Rip City", the meaning for which Schonely has no explanation, nonetheless caught on and became synonymous with the team and the city of Portland.

Barnett played alongside many of the league's Hall of Famers, including Warriors stars Rick Barry and Nate Thurmond, as well as Bill Russell, John Havlicek, Walt Frazier, Earl Monroe, Pete Maravich and Julius Erving.  Nicknamed "Crazy Horse", Barnett averaged 11.7 points, 3.1 rebounds and 3.0 assists in 732 games.

Broadcasting 
Barnett currently works for NBC Sports Bay Area and was the Warriors' television analyst from the 1985–1986 NBA season, working alongside play-by-play announcer Bob Fitzgerald until the 2018—2019 NBA season. During the playoffs, or when games were nationally televised, he moved over to radio and worked alongside Tim Roye on KGMZ-FM's 95.7 The Game.

Beginning with the 2019—2020 NBA season, he became the Warriors' full-time color analyst on 95.7 The Game, and was replaced by fellow former player Kelenna Azubuike as the color commentator on NBC Sports Bay Area. Barnett joined Fitzgerald for the first Warriors home game telecast from the Chase Center in San Francisco, and travels with the team for road games.

Personal life 
Barnett married his wife Sandy in 1966. Divorced in 1998. They have one daughter named Jennifer, along with one granddaughter, Stella.

References

External links

Golden State Warriors bio (2012)

1944 births
Living people
American men's basketball players
Basketball players from South Carolina
Boston Celtics draft picks
Boston Celtics players
Golden State Warriors announcers
Golden State Warriors players
New Orleans Jazz expansion draft picks
New Orleans Jazz players
New York Knicks players
Oregon Ducks men's basketball players
Philadelphia 76ers players
Portland Trail Blazers players
San Diego Rockets expansion draft picks
San Diego Rockets players
Shooting guards
Small forwards
Sportspeople from Greenville, South Carolina
Basketball players from Riverside, California